Metanarsia onzella is a moth of the family Gelechiidae. It is found in south-eastern Kazakhstan, Uzbekistan, Turkmenistan and Russia (the southern European part).

The length of the forewings is 7.5–8 mm. There are yellow patches on the costal, posterior and subapical areas of the forewings. The outer margin is dark grey. The hindwings are grey. Adults are on wing in June and August.

References

Moths described in 1887
Metanarsia